The 2018 Grote Prijs Jef Scherens was the 52nd edition of the Grote Prijs Jef Scherens road cycling one day race in and around Leuven. It was held on 16 September 2018 as a 1.1 categorised race and was part of the 2018 UCI Europe Tour and the 2018 Belgian Road Cycling Cup.

Leuven-born Jasper Stuyven won the group in a bunch sprint ahead of Jonas van Genechten and defending champion Timothy Dupont.

Teams
Twenty-three teams were invited to take part in the race. These included three UCI WorldTeams, nine UCI Professional Continental teams and eleven UCI Continental teams.

Result

References

External links

Grote Prijs Jef Scherens
2018 UCI Europe Tour
2018 in Belgian sport